The economy of the European Union is the joint economy of the member states of the European Union (EU). It is the third largest economy in the world in nominal terms, after the United States and China, and the third one in purchasing power parity (PPP) terms, after China and the United States. The European Union's GDP estimated to be around $16.6 trillion (nominal) in 2022 representing around one sixth of the global economy. Germany has by far the biggest national GDP of all EU countries, followed by France and Italy as number 2 and 3.

The euro is the second largest reserve currency and the second most traded currency in the world after the United States dollar. The euro is used by 20 of its  members, overall, it is the official currency in 26 countries, in the eurozone and in six other European countries, officially or de facto.

The European Union economy consists of an internal market of mixed economies based on free market and advanced social models. For instance, it includes an internal single market with free movement of goods, services, capital, and labor. The GDP per capita (PPP) was $43,188 in 2018, compared to $62,869 in the United States, $44,246 in Japan and $18,116 in China. There are significant disparities in GDP per capita (PPP) between member states ranging from $106,372 in Luxembourg to $23,169 in Bulgaria. With a low Gini coefficient of 31, the European Union has a more egalitarian distribution of income than the world average.

EU's investments in foreign countries total $9.1 trillion, while the foreign investments made in the European Union total $5.1 trillion in 2012, by far the highest foreign and domestic investments in the world. Euronext is the main stock exchange of the Eurozone and the world's sixth largest by market capitalisation. The European Union's largest trading partners are the United States, China, the United Kingdom, Switzerland, Russia, Turkey, Japan, Norway, South Korea, India, and Canada. In 2018, public debt in the European Union was 80% of GDP, with disparities between the lowest rate, Estonia with 8.4%, and the highest, Greece with 181.1%.

Currency

Beginning in the year 1999 with some EU member states, now 20 out of  EU states use the euro as official currency in a currency union. The remaining 8 states continued to use their own currency with the possibility to join the euro later. The euro is also the most widely used currency in the EU.

Since 1992, the Maastricht Treaty sets out rigid economic and fiscal convergence criteria for the states joining the euro. Starting 1997, the Stability and Growth Pact has been started to ensure continuing economic and fiscal stability and convergence.

Denmark is not a part of the eurozone due to its special opt-outs concerning the later joining of the euro. In contrast, Sweden can effectively opt out by choosing when or whether to join the European Exchange Rate Mechanism, which is the preliminary step towards joining. The remaining states are committed to join the euro through their Treaties of Accession.

Starting with Greece in 2009, five of the 20 eurozone states have been struggling with a sovereign debt crisis, by many called the European debt crisis. All these states started reforms and got bailout packages (Greece, Republic of Ireland, Portugal, Spain, Cyprus). As of 2015, all countries but Greece have recovered from their debt crisis. Other non-eurozone states also experienced a debt crisis and also went through successful bailout programmes, i.e. Hungary, Romania and Latvia (the latter before it joined the eurozone).

Budget

The EU has a long-term budget, named Multiannual Financial Framework (MFF), of €1,082.5 billion for the period 2014–2020, representing 1.02% of the EU-28's GNI.

The overall budget for the period 2021-2027 is of €1.8 trillion combining the MFF of €1,074.3 billion with an extraordinary recovery fund of €750 billion, known as Next Generation EU, to support member states hit by the COVID-19 pandemic.

Sectors

Services

The services sector is by far the most important sector in the European Union, making up 64.7% of GDP, compared to the manufacturing industry with 23.8% of GDP and agriculture with only 1.5% of GDP.

Financial services are well developed within the Single Market of the Union. Companies have a greater reliance on bank lending than in the United States, although a shift towards companies raising more funding through capital markets is planned through the CMU initiative, the EU plan put forward by the Commission in September 2015 to mobilise the free movement of capital within the EU. The plan aims "to establish the building blocks of an integrated capital market in the EU by 2019". The CMU initiative comprises 33 measures in all. The plan was updated in 2017 and in 2019, since not a single legislation will deliver the CMU. The Commissioner for Financial Stability, Financial Services and Capital Markets Union, Mairead McGuinness, former Vice-President of the European Parliament, is responsible for delivery of the initiative.

According to the Global Financial Centres Index, the two largest financial centres in Europe, London and Zurich, are outside the European Union. The two largest financial centres remaining within the EU will then be Frankfurt and Luxembourg City.

In the European Investment Bank's Investment survey 2021, 58% of firms in the service sector were expecting long term effects of COVID-19. 56% of EU enterprises received governmental help to handle the pandemic's effects.

The COVID-19 pandemic had a significant impact on sales. 49% of all EU enterprises claimed that their sales decreased since the start of 2020. The pandemic has affected sectors differently, with the number of enterprises losing money in the hotels, restaurants, arts, and leisure industries reaching roughly 25% compared to previous times, and transportation also being affected.

Without government assistance, 35% of European small and medium-sized firms (SMEs) in manufacturing and services indicated their businesses would not have survived the effects of the pandemic.

In 2020, 86% of enterprises reported previous-year investment activity, while in 2021 only 79% reported investment. 23% of EU firms changed their investment plans in 2021, with only 3% reporting a higher amount. The highest proportion of enterprises that have reduced their investment plans due to a drop in sales are in Poland, where 49% of firms have reduced investment, and in Belgium, where 47% of firms stated the same.

Most green or digital businesses in the EU operate in manufacturing (33%) or infrastructure (30%). The service sector has the greatest percentage of businesses that have not engaged in digitalization or the green transition (41%).

Agriculture
The agricultural sector is supported by subsidies from the European Union in the form of the Common Agricultural Policy (CAP). In 2013 this represented approximately €45billion (less than 33% of the overall budget of €148billion) of the EU's total spending. It was used originally to guarantee a minimum price for farmers in the EU. This is criticised as a form of protectionism, inhibiting trade, and damaging developing countries; one of the most vocal opponents was the UK, the second largest economy within the bloc until its withdrawal in January 2020, which repeatedly refused to give up the annual UK rebate unless the CAP should undergo significant reform; France, the biggest beneficiary of the CAP and the bloc's third largest (now its second-largest) economy, is its most vocal proponent. The CAP is however witnessing substantial reform. In 1985, around 70% of the EU budget was spent on agriculture. In 2011, direct aid to farmers and market-related expenditure amount to just 30% of the budget, and rural development spending to 11%. By 2011, 90% of direct support had become non-trade-distorting (not linked to production) as reforms have continued to be made to the CAP, its funding and its design.

Tourism
The European Union is a major tourist destination, attracting visitors from outside of the Union and citizens travelling inside it. Internal tourism is made more convenient by the Schengen treaty and the euro. All citizens of the European Union are entitled to travel to any member state without the need of a visa.

France is the world's number one tourist destination for international visitors, followed by Spain, Italy, and Germany. It is worth noting, however, that a significant proportion of international visitors to EU countries are from other member states.

Energy 

The European Union has uranium, coal, oil, and natural gas reserves. There are six oil producers in the European Union, primarily in North Sea oilfields. The United Kingdom, whilst it was a member of the European Union was by far the largest producer; Denmark, Germany, Italy, Romania and the Netherlands produce oil.
The European Union produced 19.8 million tonnes of oil equivalent (Mtoe) of crude oil in 2019.
The EU is one of the largest consumers of oil, consuming much more than it can produce. It consumed about 350 Mtoe in 2019, importing 96.8% of the oil. The largest suppliers are Russia, Iraq, Nigeria, Saudi Arabia, Kazakhstan, and Norway.
Transport is the largest consumer of oil, at 66.1% in 2019.

All countries in the EU have committed to the Kyoto Protocol, and the European Union is one of its biggest proponents. The European Commission published proposals for the first comprehensive EU energy policy on 10 January 2007.

During the green transition, workers in carbon-intensive industries are more likely to lose their jobs. In the years to come, the transition to a carbon-neutral economy will put more jobs at danger in regions with higher percentages of employment in carbon-intensive industries. Employment opportunities by the green transition are associated with the use of renewable energy sources or building activity for infrastructure improvements and renovations.

Companies

The European Union's member states are the birthplace of many of the world's largest leading multinational companies, and home to its global headquarters. Among these are distinguished companies ranked first in the world within their industry/sector, like Allianz and AXA, which are the two largest financial service providers in the world by revenue; WPP plc and Publicis which are the world's largest advertising agencies by revenue; Amorim, which is the world's largest cork-processing and cork producer company; ArcelorMittal, which is the largest steel company in the world; Christian Dior SE which is the biggest fashion group in the world and Inditex is the world’s second biggest fashion group; Groupe Danone, which has the world leadership in the dairy products market.

Anheuser-Busch InBev is the largest beer company in the world; L'Oréal Group, which is the world's largest cosmetics and beauty company; LVMH, which is the world's largest luxury goods conglomerate; Nokia Corporation, which was the world's largest manufacturer of mobile telephones; Shell plc, Électricité de France, TotalEnergies, Eni which are one of the largest energy corporations in the world; and Stora Enso, which is the world's largest pulp and paper manufacturer in terms of production capacity, in terms of banking and finance the EU has some of the world's largest notably BNP Paribas, HSBC, Crédit Agricole, Grupo Santander, Société Générale and Groupe BPCE the largest bank in Europe in terms of Market Capitalisation and assets.

Many other European companies rank among the world's largest companies in terms of turnover, profit, market share, number of employees or other major indicators. A considerable number of EU-based companies are ranked among the world's top-ten within their sector of activity.
Europe is also home to many prestigious car companies such as Aston Martin, Automobiles Alpine, BMW, Bugatti, Ferrari, Jaguar, Lamborghini, Land Rover, Maserati, Mercedes-Benz, Porsche, Volvo, as well as volume manufacturers such as Automobile Dacia, Citroën, Fiat, Opel, Peugeot, Renault, Seat, Volkswagen and more.

In Europe, 33% of jobs are within enterprises that have not digitally transformed. These companies were also less likely to train their employees throughout the COVID-19 outbreak. Across the European Union, the most commonly mentioned investment barrier is the lack of trained labor. 75% of businesses in transition regions found this to be problematic. Numerous reasons, such as demographics and rising demand for skills that are less common on the market, such as those needed to support digitalization activities, might contribute to the lack of competent workers. In all areas of Europe, digital businesses have produced "better" employment with greater earnings than their non-digital counterparts. Additionally, they are more inclined to recognize and reward individuals who do well.

The following is a list of the largest EU based stock market listed companies in 2022. The ordered by revenue in millions of US Dollars and is based on the Fortune Global 500.

Economies of member states

Wealth

The twelve new member states of the European Union have enjoyed a higher average percentage growth rate than their elder members of the EU. Slovakia has the highest GDP growth in the period 2005–2015 among all countries of the European Union (See Tatra Tiger). Notably the Baltic states have achieved high GDP growth, with Latvia topping 11%, close to China, the world leader at 9% on average for the past 25 years (though these gains have been in great part cancelled by the late-2000s recession).

Reasons for this growth include government commitments to stable monetary policy, export-oriented trade policies, low flat-tax rates and the utilisation of relatively cheap labour. In 2015 Ireland had the highest GDP growth of all the states in EU (25.1%).
The current map of EU growth is one of huge regional variation, with the larger economies suffering from stagnant growth and the new nations enjoying sustained, robust economic growth.

In mid-2021, the European Union's gross saving rate was 18% of gross disposable income, higher above the prior COVID-19 pandemic average of 11–13%. In the second quarter of 2020, families' primary income fell by 7.3% compared to the second quarter of 2019, and their secondary income (from social security payments and other transfers) increased by 6.5% of gross income.

Although EU27 GDP is rising, the percentage of gross world product is decreasing because of the emergence of economies such as China, India and Brazil.

In the tables below, colours indicate  and  performer of the year concerned.

Labour market

The EU seasonally adjusted unemployment rate was 6.7% in September 2018. The euro area unemployment rate was 8.1%. Among the member states, the lowest unemployment rates were recorded in the Czech Republic (2.3%), Germany and Poland (both 3.4%), and the highest in Spain (14.9%) and Greece (19.0 in July 2018).

Unemployment rate
The following table shows the history of the unemployment rate for all European Union member states:

Public finance

Trade

The European Union is the largest exporter in the world and as of 2008 the largest importer of goods and services. Internal trade between the member states is aided by the removal of barriers to trade such as tariffs and border controls. In the eurozone, trade is helped by not having any currency differences to deal with amongst most members.

The European Union Association Agreement does something similar for a much larger range of countries, partly as a so-called soft approach ('a carrot instead of a stick') to influence the politics in those countries.
The European Union represents all its members at the World Trade Organization (WTO), and acts on behalf of member states in any disputes. When the EU negotiates trade related agreement outside the WTO framework, the subsequent agreement must be approved by each individual EU member state government.

Regional variation

Comparing the richest areas of the EU can be a difficult task. This is because the NUTS 1 & 2 regions are not homogenous, some of them being very large regions, such as NUTS-1 Hesse (21,100 km2) or NUTS-1 Île-de-France (12,011 km2), whilst other NUTS regions are much smaller, for example NUTS-1 Hamburg (755 km2). An extreme example is Finland, which is divided for historical reasons into mainland Finland with 5.3 million inhabitants and Åland, an autonomous archipelago with a population of 27,000, or about the population of a small Finnish city.

One problem with this data is that some areas are subject to a large number of commuters coming into the area, thereby artificially inflating the figures. It has the effect of raising GDP but not altering the number of people living in the area, inflating the GDP per capita figure. Similar problems can be produced by a large number of tourists visiting the area.
The data is used to define regions that are supported with financial aid in programs such as the European Regional Development Fund.
The decision to delineate a Nomenclature of Territorial Units for Statistics (NUTS) region is to a large extent arbitrary (i.e. not based on objective and uniform criteria across Europe), and is decided at European level (See also: Regions of the European Union).

NUTS-1 and NUTS-2 regions

The top 10 NUTS-1 and NUTS-2 regions with the highest GDP per capita are almost all, except one, in the first fifteen-member states: Prague is the only one in the 13 new member states that joined in May 2004, January 2007 and July 2013. The leading regions in the ranking of NUTS-2 regional GDP per inhabitant in 2019 were the Grand Duchy of Luxembourg (260%), the Southern region of Ireland (240%), and Prague, Czech Republic (205%). Figures for these three regions, however, were artificially inflated by the commuters who do not reside in these regions ("Net commuter inflows in these regions push up production to a level that could not be achieved by the resident active population on its own. The result is that GDP per inhabitant appears to be overestimated in these regions and underestimated in regions with commuter outflows.". Another example of artificial inflation is Groningen. The calculated GDP per capita is very high because of the large natural gas reserves in this region, but Groningen is one of the poorest parts in the Netherlands.

Among the 16 NUTS-2 regions exceeding the 160% level in 2020, two were in Belgium, Germany, Ireland and the Netherlands and one each in the Czech Republic, Denmark, France, Poland, Romania, Slovakia and Sweden, as well as in the single region Grand Duchy of Luxembourg.

The NUTS Regulation lays down a minimum population size of 3 million and a maximum size of 7 million for the average NUTS-1 region, whereas a minimum of 800,000 and a maximum of 3 million for NUTS-2 regions. This definition, however, is not respected by Eurostat. For example, the région of Île-de-France, with 11.6 million inhabitants, is treated as a NUTS-2 region, while the state Free Hanseatic City of Bremen, with only 664,000 inhabitants, is treated as a NUTS-1 region.

Among the lowest regions in the ranking in 2021 most were in Bulgaria, with the lowest figure recorded in South-Central Region.
Among the poorest 20 regions, six were in Greece, five in Bulgaria, three in Hungary, two in France and one each in Croatia, Poland, Romania and Slovakia.

See also
Blue Banana
Citizenship of the European Union
Currencies of the European Union
European Central Bank
Economic and Monetary Union
Capital Markets Union
Banking Union
European Investment Bank
European Union value added tax
List of largest European companies by revenue
Central banks and currencies of Europe
Euro convergence criteria
Currency
List of European stock exchanges
List of currencies in Europe

References

Cells shaded in green indicate forecast figure
 One region may be classified by Eurostat as a NUTS-1, NUTS-2 as well as a NUTS-3 region. Several NUTS-1 regions are also classified as NUTS-2 regions such as Brussels-Capital or Ile-de-France. Many countries are only classified as a single NUTS-1 and a single NUTS-2 region such as Latvia, Lithuania, Luxemburg and (although over 3 million inhabitants) Denmark.

The following links are used for the GDP growth and GDP totals (IMF):
Link to 10 new memberstates Growth Rates
Link to Growth Rates for the Eurozone
Link to non-Eurozone EU15 countries Growth Rates

External links
 European Commission – Economic and Financial Affairs
 Eurostat – Statistics Explained – All articles on economy and finance

 
 
European Union